Tabanus dorsifer is a species of horse fly in the family Tabanidae.

Distribution
Mexico, United States.

References

Tabanidae
Insects described in 1860
Taxa named by Francis Walker (entomologist)
Diptera of North America